Jonas Jensen (born 25 October 1985) is a Danish footballer who lastly played for Danish Superliga club Esbjerg fB.

References

Danish men's footballers
Danish Superliga players
1985 births
Living people
Esbjerg fB players
FC Fyn players
Skive IK players
Association football goalkeepers